Eucereon varia is a moth of the subfamily Arctiinae. It was described by Francis Walker in 1854. It is found in Pará in Brazil, in Panama and possibly in Colombia.

References

 

varia
Moths described in 1854
Moths of South America
Moths of Central America